Kieran Morris (born 14 June 1990) is an Irish sportsperson.  He plays hurling with his local club Moycarkey-Borris and with the Tipperary senior inter-county team since 2014.

Career
Morris was named in the Tipperary squad for the 2016 National Hurling League and made his league debut on 20 March against Cork, starting at right corner forward.

Honours

Tipperary
 Munster Under-21 Hurling Championship (1): 2010
 All-Ireland Under-21 Hurling Championship (1): 2010
 All-Ireland Intermediate Hurling Championship (1): 2012
 Munster Intermediate Hurling Championship (1): 2012
 Waterford Crystal Cup (1): 2014

References

External links
Tipperary GAA Player Profile

Tipperary inter-county hurlers
Moycarkey-Borris hurlers
Living people
1990 births
Place of birth missing (living people)